MSVS may refer to:

Microsoft Visual Studio
Medium Support Vehicle System, a Canadian Forces truck